The Hungarian Rugby Player of the Year (Az év rögbijátékosa) is awarded to the player voted the best in Hungary.

History
It was first awarded in 1992 with László Kump of Elefántok as the inaugural winner. Since 2006 there is also given an award to the best female player with Petra Pölöskei of Fehérvár receiving the first award.

Winners

Trivia
 The Miskolc club, for which Attila Kardos played, has since gone out of existence.

References

Rugby union trophies and awards